The Arab Cup 2009 was planned to be the ninth staging of the Arab Cup, an association football tournament held between Arab countries by UAFA. The first stage of qualifying began in December 2006, but no further rounds were played and the tournament was cancelled due to lack of sponsorship.

Qualifications
The first qualifying stage contained eight teams which had lower FIFA ranking. The eight teams were divided into two groups. Each group contained four teams and the group winners qualified for the second qualifying stage.

The second qualifying stage contained 16 seats; 14 teams which had a higher FIFA ranking get byes from the first qualifying round and were entered into the second qualifying round, and two teams from the first qualifying stage got the last two seats. 16 teams were divided into four groups, four teams in each group and the group winners and runners-up qualified for the Arab Cup.

The teams sorted by Alphabetical order

First qualifying round
 The first qualifying stage contained eight teams which had lower FIFA rankings. The eight teams were divided into two groups, each with four teams.  The group winners qualified for the second qualifying stage.
 Lebanon  qualified as best runners-up due to the withdrawal of Qatar (Qatar would have received a bye to the second qualifying round).
 Palestine withdrew due to traveling problem as Israel did not allow them to travel to Yemen.

Group 1
Qualifying tournament of group 1 held in Yemen.

Group 2
Qualifying tournament of group 2 held in Lebanon.

Second qualifying round
 The second qualifying stage contained 16 seats, 14 teams with a higher FIFA ranking got byes from the first qualifying round and were entered into the second qualifying round, plus two teams from the first qualifying stage to complete the last two seats. 16 teams were divided into four groups, with four teams in each group.  The group winners and runners-up qualified for the Arab Cup.
 Qatar withdrew and Lebanon qualified as best runners-up.

West Asia Region
 
 
 
 

Gulf Region
 
 
 
 

North Africa Region
 
 
 
 

Red Sea Region
 
 
 
 

 The second round was never played and the tournament was eventually canceled.

Final round
The final tournament was cancelled because of no sponsor.

References

External links
 Details in RSSSF

 
2009 in Asian football
2009 in African football
Cancelled association football competitions